Chris Lewis  (born June 15, 1976) is a Canadian politician who was elected to represent the riding of Essex in the House of Commons of Canada in the 2019 Canadian federal election, and was re-elected in 2021.

Before entering federal politics, Lewis was a municipal councillor in Kingsville, Ontario.

In 2022 under interim leader Candice Bergen, Lewis was appointed as Shadow Minister for Labour, after being appointed as Deputy Shadow Minister for Labour under leader Erin O’Toole.

Electoral record

References

External links

Living people
Conservative Party of Canada MPs
Members of the House of Commons of Canada from Ontario
Year of birth uncertain
Progressive Conservative Party of Ontario candidates in Ontario provincial elections
People from Essex County, Ontario
Ontario municipal councillors
1976 births